Lucy Mack Smith (July 8, 1775 – May 14, 1856) was the mother of Joseph Smith, founder of the Latter Day Saint movement. She is noted for writing the memoir, Biographical Sketches of Joseph Smith, the Prophet, and His Progenitors for Many Generations and was an important leader of the movement during Joseph's life.

Background and early life 
Lucy Mack was born on July 8, 1775, in Gilsum, New Hampshire, during an era of political, economic, and social change. The second half of the eighteenth century had seen a slowly evolving shift of responsibilities within the American family. Even though the Revolutionary War would accelerate that shift, the initial impetus came from the changing economic scene. According to women's historian Linda Kerber, the growing market economy and "industrial technology reshaped the contours of domestic labor" (7). This shift toward commercialism pushed the father's work farther away from the home, with the result that the mother now took over the father's former role of final responsibility for the children's education and for their moral and religious training (Bloch, 113). Magazines and educational publications heralded mothers as "the chief transmitters of religious and moral values" (Bloch, 101).

Mack was proud of her father's involvement in the Revolutionary War. Even though Solomon Mack was not committed to any religious belief system, he certainly appreciated the diligence of his wife in attending to the spiritual and educational needs of their children. "All the flowery eloquence of the pulpit," he said, could not match the influence of his wife on their children (chap. 1). Mack's mother, Lydia Gates Mack, was an example of the kind of "moral mother" increasingly celebrated during the last decades of the eighteenth century. Mack's older brother, Jason, became a "seeker" and eventually formed his own religious community; her two older sisters each had a visionary confirmation that their sins were forgiven and that God called them to "witness" to others of the need for repentance. Such gestures of piety were expected in the highly charged revivalist climate of the day. As historians have noted, clergymen "encouraged people to induce 'visions'" (Buel, 11). Mack's father, after a period of acute suffering in body and mind, underwent his own religious conversion in 1810.

In rural areas of northern New England, the proliferation of evangelical religious sects and the pre-Victorian emphasis on the family as a moral force were especially significant forces in Mack's life. Migrants to this area had taken with them the revolutionary spirit of political independence. They had also encouraged the breakdown of the old order of religious domination. "The grip of colonial religious culture was broken and a new American style of religious diversity came into being." Such a setting became fertile ground for religious experimentation and the birth of indigenous religious sects, some of which "undertook to redefine social and economic order through the model of the extended family." Without stable institutional structures, the family thus became the "crucible" for forming "primary identity, socialization, and cultural norms for rural life" (Marini, 7, 56, 31). Mack was a product of this environment.

Marriage and children
Lucy Mack married Joseph Smith Sr., in January 1796, bringing a wedding gift of $1,000 from her brother, Stephen, and his business partner, John Mudget. Lucy Smith assumed the responsibility for the moral and religious guidance of her children as well as for their secular education. As a result, she emerges as a major influence in preparing them for their involvement in the founding of The Church of Jesus Christ of Latter-day Saints.

After six years of marriage, Smith became very ill, was diagnosed with "confirmed consumption," the disease from which her sisters Lovisa and Lovina had died, and was given up by the doctors (Smith, chap. 11). Smith did not feel prepared for death and judgment: "I knew not the ways of Christ, besides there appeared to be a dark and lonesome chasm between myself and the Saviour, which I dared not attempt to pass." By making a gigantic effort, she perceived "a faint glimmer of light." She spent the night pleading with the Lord to spare her life so she could bring up her children (Alvin and Hyrum) and "be a comfort" to her husband. She vowed that, if her life was spared, she would serve God with all her heart, whereupon she heard a voice advising her, "Seek and ye shall find; knock and it shall be opened unto you. Let your heart be comforted; ye believe in God, believe also in me." From that point on, Smith began a long search for a religion that would teach her the way of salvation. In so doing, she was following the precepts of her culture. During this post-revolutionary period, religious speakers constantly emphasized the "cultivation" of female piety so that women might more ably fulfill their role as a "moral mother" (Bloch, 118).

Smith continued to educate her children in secular as well as spiritual matters. Dr. John Stafford of Palmyra, New York interviewed in 1880, remembered that Smith "had a great deal of faith that their children were going to do something great" and also recalled that Smith taught her ten children from the Bible. (Although Smith gave birth to eleven children, their first died shortly after childbirth in 1797.) Stafford did not comment on the spiritual precepts they thus garnered but rather on the children's educational achievements. Joseph Jr. had been "quite illiterate," he said, but "after they began to have school at their house, he improved greatly" (Vogel 2:122). Smith's ambitions for, and faith in, her children's abilities were not unusual for a mother of that time. Linda Kerber tells how the republican mother was to "encourage in her sons civic interest and participation. She was to educate her children and guide them in the paths of morality and virtue" (283). Nancy Woloch, notes that ministers, after "discarding predestination as an axiom, now suggested that mothers, not God, were responsible for their children's souls" (121). Smith took such responsibilities seriously in her own family. William Smith later affirmed that his mother was a very pious woman and much interested in the welfare of her children, both here and hereafter: "She prevailed on us to attend the meetings [the Methodist revival being preached by George Lane], and almost the whole family became interested in the matter and seekers after truth. ... My mother continued her importunities and exertions to interest us in the importance of seeking for the salvation of our immortal souls, until almost all of the family became either converted or seriously inclined" (Vogel 1:494–95).

Smith's piety and principles were major moral influence in her children's lives, but she was also concerned about her husband's spiritual well-being. New England ministers declared that a wife's conversion could also help her perform "her great task of bringing men back to God" (Welter, 162). Various publications of the early nineteenth century pointed out:Religion or piety was the core of women's virtue, the source of her strength. Religion belonged to woman by divine right, a gift of God and nature. This "peculiar susceptibility" to religion was given her for a reason: "the vestal flame of piety, lighted tip by Heaven in the breast of woman" would throw its beams into the naughty world of men (Welter, 152).

According to Nancy Woloch, "Female converts outnumbered male converts three to two in the Second Great Awakening in New England. ... By 1814, for instance, women outnumbered men in the churches and religious societies in rural Utica, and they could be relied upon to urge the conversion of family members" (121).

Smith took the initiative in trying to involve her family in seeking the "true church." In light of Joseph Sr.'s indifference, she sought consolation in prayer that the gospel would be brought to her husband and was reassured by a dream that her husband would be given "the pure and undefiled Gospel of the Son of God" (56). About this time, Joseph Sr. began having dreams with symbolic content that were interpreted as being related to his ambivalence about religious faith. These dreams continued after the family's move to Palmyra, New York, until he had had seven in all; Lucy remembered five well enough to quote in detail.

Book of Mormon 
Smith's efforts to find the true religion continued in Palmyra. She went from sect to sect; sometime after 1824, she and three of her children—Hyrum, Samuel, and Sophronia—joined Western Presbyterian Church, the only church with a meetinghouse in Palmyra. Although Smith longed for her family to be united in their religious faith, she could not persuade her husband nor her son Joseph to join them.

In 1827, when Joseph obtained the golden plates which told of the history of the early inhabitants of the American continent, Smith stopped going to Presbyterian meetings. She said, "We were now confirmed in the opinion that God was about to bring to light something upon which we could stay our minds, or that he would give us a more perfect knowledge of the plan of salvation and the redemption of the human family. This caused us greatly to rejoice, the sweetest union and happiness pervaded our house, and tranquility reigned in our midst" (Smith, chap. 19). Much of Smith's attention during this period was directed towards the hope that her family would be the instrument in bringing salvation to the whole human family. When Joseph went on to establish what he taught was the restoration of the original Christian church, it was the means of making his mother's dream of a family united in religious harmony come true. Joseph's project of "restoration" was thought of by his mother as a Smith family enterprise: as Jan Shipps has pointed out, Lucy Smith employs the pronouns "we", "ours", and "us" rather than simply referring to Joseph's particular role (Mormonism, 107).

Church leadership 

Smith took on the role as a mother figure to converts who were baptized into the Church of Christ. In Kirtland, Ohio, Smith shared her home with newly arrived immigrants, sometimes sleeping on the floor herself when the house was full. She participated in missionary work and at one time stood up to a Presbyterian minister in defense of her faith.

When Joseph made his father the church's first patriarch in December 1833, he emphasized the familial nature of the early Mormon movement. Likening his father to Adam, Joseph said, "So shall it be with my father; he shall be called a prince over his posterity, holding the keys of the patriarchal priesthood over the kingdom of God on earth, even the Church of the Latter Day Saints" (qtd. in Bates and Smith, 34). In this calling, "Father Smith" was to give patriarchal blessings to the Latter Day Saints; when he attended the blessing meetings, he insisted that his wife accompany him (chap. 44). On at least one occasion, Lucy Smith added her blessing or confirmed what had already been received (Crosby).

During the Missouri period when Joseph Jr. and Hyrum were imprisoned in Liberty Jail, Lucy Smith was a leader in her family and church. In Nauvoo, Illinois, Smith became isolated in caring for her dying husband and her role in the church therefore diminished. Her husband's dying blessing on her was to reaffirm her role and status: "Mother, do you not know that you are the mother of as great a family as ever lived upon the earth. ... They are raised up to do the Lord's work" (chap. 52).

Family deaths 
Smith's eldest child, Alvin, died November 19, 1823. Her next two sons Joseph and Hyrum were killed on June 27, 1844, in Carthage, Illinois. When Smith saw the bodies of her martyred sons, she cried "My God, my God, why hast thou forsaken this family?" (chap. 54). About one month later, her son Samuel died after a month of illness brought on by exposure and other events incident to the murders of Joseph and Hyrum. Of this time, Smith recalls, "I was left desolate in my distress. I had reared six sons to manhood, and of them all, one only remained, and he too far distant to speak one consoling word to me in this trying hour" (chap. 54). William, the surviving son, was on a mission in New York when his brothers died.

Succession crisis 

After the death of Joseph and Hyrum, a crisis of leadership gripped the church. Hyrum had been Joseph's chosen successor, and it was unclear who should lead when both were killed. While Smith initially supported the leadership claims of James Strang, ultimately a majority of Latter Day Saints sided with the leadership of Brigham Young and the other members of the Quorum of the Twelve.

James Strang published a statement allegedly signed by Smith, her son William, and her three daughters, certifying that "the Smith family do believe in the appointment of J. J. Strang" as Joseph's successor. However, Smith later addressed church members at the October 1844 general conference and stated that she hoped all her children would accompany the Latter Day Saints to the west, and if they did, she too would go. Young said: "We have extended the helping hand to Mother Smith. She has the best carriage in the city, and, while she lives, shall ride in it when and where she pleases" (Millennial Star, vol. 7, p. 23).

At this time, Smith became a symbol of continuity, assuming greater importance at that time because of the strained relationship between Young and one of Joseph's widows, Emma. Hosea Stout noted in his diary on February 23, 1845, that Smith spoke at a church meeting. She spoke "with the most feeling and heartbroken manner" of "the trials and troubles she had passed through in establishing the Church of Christ and the persecutions and afflictions which her sons & husband had passed through" (1:23). Smith also asked permission to speak at the October 1845 general conference in Nauvoo. After she had recited the sufferings of her family on behalf of the church, she asked if they considered her a mother in Israel. Young formally conferred this title on Smith by saying: "All who consider Mother Smith as a mother in Israel, signify by saying 'yes.' One universal 'yes' rang throughout" (History of the Church 7:470-71).

Smith did not comment about the difficulties she encountered with church leaders during the transitional period—troubles which, without doubt, were exacerbated by her son William's refusal to be subservient to Young—but they are suggested in the few letters and second-hand accounts that have survived (Quaife, 246–48). Whether Smith again shifted her support from Young to Strang in the year following the October 1845 conference is a matter of debate. What is certain is that she never attempted the journey to Utah Territory: she remained in Nauvoo with her daughters, her daughter-in-law, Emma, and Emma and Joseph's sons (Joseph III, David Hyrum, Alexander Hale, and Frederick G. W.) until her death in May 1856.

Ancestry and descendants

Smith was a third cousin of Oliver Cowdery, who was a golden plates witness, a Book of Mormon scribe, and the original Second Elder and Assistant President of the Church.

See also
 Joseph Smith Papyri

References

Further reading

External links

 Joseph Smith Sr The Joseph Smith Sr. & Lucy Mack Foundation

1775 births
1856 deaths
American Latter Day Saint writers
Burials at the Smith Family Cemetery
Converts to Mormonism from Presbyterianism
History of the Latter Day Saint movement
Latter Day Saints from New York (state)
Leaders in the Church of Christ (Latter Day Saints)
People from Cheshire County, New Hampshire
People from Ontario County, New York
People from Palmyra, New York
Religious leaders from New York (state)
Smith family (Latter Day Saints)